The Namaqua slender mongoose (Herpestes sanguineus swalius), also known as the Namibian slender mongoose, is a subspecies of the common slender mongoose. It is endemic to Namibia.

References

Herpestes
Taxa named by Oldfield Thomas